Mocis dolosa is a species of moth of the family Erebidae. It is found in China, Japan (Honshu) and Taiwan.

References

Moths described in 1919
Mocis
Moths of Asia
Taxa named by Arthur Gardiner Butler